Maharg is a surname. Notable people with the surname include:

Billy Maharg (1881–1953), American boxer
John Archibald Maharg (1872–1944), Canadian politician in Saskatchewan